Kang Nam-gil (born August 27, 1958) is a South Korean actor. Kang made his acting debut as a 9-year-old child actor in 1966. He later transitioned to adult roles in 1981 with Let Us Love written by Kim Soo-hyun (and dropped out of Hanyang University's English Language and Literature department). Kang drew popularity when he starred in the family drama Under the Same Roof in 1986, but became best known for playing "Dal-soo" in the single-episode MBC Best Theater, which used his character to satirize the social issues of the day. The Trial of Dal-soo reached 25.7% viewership ratings, the highest in the anthology series' history. In 2000, Kang and his wife divorced on charges of adultery on her part, and his subsequent hospitalization from a heart attack led him to take a hiatus from his acting career and move with his son and daughter to England. He returned to Korea four years later, and made his comeback with People of the Water Flower Village. Kang is also an author of computer books for beginners, and in 2004 he published Oh! My God, a memoir about his life as a stay-at-home dad in Birmingham. In 2008, he played one of the leading roles in the spirit possession dramedy Who Are You?.

Filmography

Television series

Film

Variety/Radio show

Books

Awards and nominations

References

External links 
 Kang Nam-gil Fan Cafe at Daum 
 
 
 

1958 births
Living people
South Korean male television actors
South Korean male film actors
South Korean male child actors
People from Seoul